The Black Mamba Anti-Poaching Unit (Black Mamba APU) is a mostly female ranger unit founded in 2013 with the purpose of protecting wildlife in South Africa, mainly in the regions of the Balule Nature Reserve and the Greater Kruger National Park. The Black Mamba APU was awarded the Champions of the Earth Award in 2015 by the United Nations Environmental Program (UNEP).

About 
The Black Mamba APU was created by Craig Spencer, the head warden of Balule Nature Reserve and Amy Clark from Transfrontier Africa. The group started out with six members. There are currently twenty-six members of the Black Mamba APU, which is named after the deadly snake, the black mamba (Dendroaspis polylepis). Twenty-four members of the Black Mambas are women and each member spends 21 days a month patrolling the reserves. They start each day, military style, with a parade and then issued orders before patrols leave on their missions. Each Black Mamba is outfitted in ranger uniforms, trained in tracking and combat, but work unarmed: they protect the animals by creating a "visible police presence, like a British bobby."

Members are all part of local communities surrounding the Balule Reserve and Greater Kruger national park. For many Black Mambas, this is their first job after high school. Wages come out of an environmental protection fund and non-labor costs, such as uniforms, are donated.

Black Mamba APU has already arrested six poachers, shut down five poacher's camps and reduced snaring of wildlife by 76% since 2013. The Mambas are trained to find and remove snares before animals are captured. During 2015, there was a period of time lasting ten months when no rhinos were poached at all.

At first people were skeptical that "women could do this traditionally male job and be good at it." Now, within their communities, the Black Mambas have become village heroes. Photographer Julia Gunther, who has been documenting the Black Mambas APU, says of the women that "For all of them, the love for nature and its conservation runs deep. Their ethos is to protect this heritage of wildlife." The rangers not only face dangers from poachers, but also from large wildlife. Siphiwe Sithole, said "I don't know when I am going to face a lion." Another member, Leitah Mkhabela, said regarding poachers, "I am not afraid. I know what I am doing and why I am doing it."

In July 2015, the Black Mamba APU won the Best Conservation Practitioner category in the South African Rhino Conservation Awards. Later that year they won the Champions of the Earth Award from UNEP.

See also
Akashinga
How Many Elephants
Holly Budge
World Female Ranger Day

References

External links 
 Official site
 Black Mambas: Saving the Rhino (video)

2013 establishments in South Africa
Nature conservation in South Africa
Organizations established in 2013
Environmental organisations based in South Africa
Poaching